María Abel Diéguez (born 24 October 1974) is a Spanish long-distance runner. She competed in the women's marathon at the 2004 Summer Olympics in which she came 26th out of 82 runners with a time of 2:40:13.

Abel's personal best in the Marathon is 2:26:58 set in Frankfurt, Germany on 27 October 2002.

References

External links
 

1974 births
Living people
Athletes (track and field) at the 2000 Summer Olympics
Athletes (track and field) at the 2004 Summer Olympics
Spanish female long-distance runners
Spanish female marathon runners
Olympic athletes of Spain